Boriss Artemjevs (born 19 January 1965) is a Latvian bobsledder. He competed at the 1992 Winter Olympics and the 1994 Winter Olympics.

References

1965 births
Living people
Latvian male bobsledders
Olympic bobsledders of Latvia
Bobsledders at the 1992 Winter Olympics
Bobsledders at the 1994 Winter Olympics
Sportspeople from Riga